Sri Avadhutha Kasinayana mandal is a mandal in Kadapa district of the Indian state of Andhra Pradesh.

References 

Mandals in Kadapa district